The Sharazoor or Sharazur District is a district of the Sulaymaniyah Governorate in the Kurdistan Region, Iraq.

See also
 Shahrizor

References 

Districts of Sulaymaniyah Province